Sir William Leveson-Gower, 4th Baronet (c. 1647 – 22 December 1691) was an English politician from the Leveson-Gower family.
Born William Gower, he was the second son of Sir Thomas Gower, 2nd Baronet and Frances, daughter and coheir of John Leveson.  He added the surname Leveson to his own in 1668, when he inherited the Trentham and Lilleshall estates of his maternal great-uncle, Sir Richard Leveson. Leveson-Gower married Lady Jane Granville (the eldest daughter of the 1st Earl of Bath) and they had five children:
Katherine (1670–?), who married Sir Edward Wyndham, 2nd Baronet,
John Leveson-Gower, later 1st Baron Gower (1675–1709).
Jane (d. 1725), who married the 4th Earl of Clarendon).
Richard (died unmarried)
William (died unmarried),

Leveson-Gower inherited his childless nephew's baronetcy in 1689 and on his own death two years later, was succeeded by his eldest surviving son, John.

Two of Leveson-Gower's well-known direct modern-day descendants are broadcaster Claire Balding and comedian Miranda Hart.

References

1640s births
1691 deaths
Baronets in the Baronetage of England
William Leveson-Gower, 4th Baronet
English MPs 1661–1679
English MPs 1679
English MPs 1680–1681
English MPs 1681
English MPs 1689–1690
English MPs 1690–1695
Members of the Parliament of England for Newcastle-under-Lyme

Year of birth uncertain